Charles Bossut (11 August 1730 – 14 January 1814) was a French mathematician and confrère of the Encyclopaedists. He was born at Tartaras, Loire, and died in Paris.

Works  
 Traité élémentaire d'hydrodynamique (1771)  later reworked as Traité théorique et expérimental d'hydrodynamique (1786–87)
 Traité élémentaire de méchanique statique (1772)
 
 
 Cours de mathématiques (1781)
 Histoire générale des mathématiques (1810)

Did write parts of the Encyclopédie on mathematics with Jean le Rond d'Alembert. 
1768 member of Académie des sciences

See also
History of fluid mechanics

External links 

1730 births
1814 deaths
People from Loire (department)
18th-century French mathematicians
19th-century French mathematicians
Members of the French Academy of Sciences
Members of the Göttingen Academy of Sciences and Humanities